Bertrand de Crombrugghe de Picquendaele is the former Ambassador Extraordinary and Plenipotentiary of the Kingdom of Belgium to the Russian Federation.

He is currently the Ambassador of the Kingdom of Belgium to the Democratic Republic of the Congo.

References 

Belgian diplomats
Year of birth missing (living people)
Living people
Ambassadors of Belgium to the Democratic Republic of the Congo
Ambassadors of Belgium to Russia